199X is the debut extended play by South Korean co-ed group, Triple H, composed of solo singer Hyuna, Pentagon member Hui, and former Pentagon member Dawn (formally known as E'Dawn). It was released by Cube Entertainment and LOEN Entertainment on May 1, 2017. The song "365 Fresh" was released as the title track.

Background and release 
On April 13, 2017, the first teaser images were released, revealing the three members of Triple H. A few days later, a concept preview video was released setting a release date for May 1, 2017, at 12 pm. On April 20, the full track list was released, revealing the name of the title track as "365 Fresh" and for the EP of five songs as 199X. On April 26, an audio teaser of the upcoming EP was released, revealing a short version of each song. From April 27 to April 29, individual teasers were released, starting with Hyuna, followed by Hui and E'Dawn.

The EP was released on May 1, 2017, through several music portals, including Melon in South Korea and iTunes for the global market.

Promotion

Single 
"365 Fresh" was released as the title track from the EP. The song debuted at number 81 on the Gaon Digital Chart with 26,199 digitals downloads sold. A music video was released in conjunction with the EP on May 1. The story follows as each member committed a crime that leads them to find each other and be followed by the police.

Commercial performance 
199X debuted at number 4 on the Gaon Album Chart on the chart issue dated April 30 - May 6, 2017. In its second week, the EP fell to number 32.

The EP also charted at number 10 on Billboard's World Albums on the week ending May 20, 2017.

The EP entered at number 22 on the Gaon Album Chart for the month of May 2017 for 5,157 physical copies sold.

Track listing 
Digital download

Charts

Release history

References 

 [199x Home Page|https://199x.me]

2017 EPs
Cube Entertainment EPs
Kakao M EPs